The Punjab University College of Pharmacy (PUCP) is a constituent college of University of the Punjab located in Lahore, Punjab, Pakistan, Pakistan. It was established in 1944.

Programs
It offers following degree programs:

Undergraduate Program

Pharm-D (Doctor of Pharmacy)

Postgraduate Programs

Master of Philosophy Programs

MPhil Pharmaceutics
MPhil Pharmacognosy
MPhil Pharmacology
MPhil Pharmaceutical Chemistry
MPhil Pharmacy Practice

Doctor of Philosophy Programs

PhD Pharmaceutics
PhD Pharmacognosy
PhD Pharmacology
PhD Pharmaceutical Chemistry

See also
List of pharmacy schools in Pakistan

References

External links
Official website
University of the Punjab Pharmacy Department
University of the Punjab

Pharmacy schools in Pakistan
University of the Punjab
1944 establishments in India
Educational institutions established in 1944